You may have been looking for Five the Hard Way (Prison Break episode)

The Sidehackers (also known as Five the Hard Way) is a 1969 American action film about motorcycle racing with a twist. Each motorcycle has a sidehack (a sidecar with a rail but no sidewalls or seat), in which a passenger rides and tilts to one side or another when going around curves. The credits thank the "Southern California Sidehack Association"; sidehacking is also known as sidecarcross or "sidecar motocross racing".

Plot 
The film centers on Rommel, a mechanic at a motorbike repair shop who works alongside his partner Luke, and competes in sidehack-style races. He and his fiancée Rita plan to get married soon. One day at work, he meets J.C., a hot-tempered entertainer and his crew, when he brings in his bike for repair. He sees a sidehack bike in the shop and takes a liking to it. Rommel offers J.C. and his group to join him in a sidehack event the upcoming weekend. At the event, J.C. enjoys watching Rommel race on the sidehack. Rommel offers J.C. to give a ride on a sidehack with him at his and Rita's cabin, and he accepts.

After a fun day of racing on Rommel's sidehack, everyone has a get together dinner party in the cabin. The party soon escalates when J.C. desperately offers Rommel to join his gang, who politely declines, and quickly loses his temper when Dirty John (one of his henchmen) tries asking
him a question and Nero (another henchman of J.C.’s) tries to calm his anger. After trying to seduce Rommel into joining again, his girlfriend, Paisley, reminds him that he's not interested. Further infuriated, everyone walks out of the cabin and J.C. takes out his anger on Paisley. The next day, while Rommel and Luke are working on a bike, Paisley comes over and tries to seduce Rommel into getting with her, wanting to get away from J.C., but he rejects her and sends her away crying.  Later, when J.C. and his men return to their hotel, they find Paisley drunk and her clothes tattered, claiming that Rommel raped her. Angered, J.C. and his gang  find Rommel and Rita in their cabin making love, and they beat Rommel unconscious. With Rommel out cold, they proceed to rape Rita, eventually killing her as a result. Luke finds out what happened to Rommel and his now-deceased fiancée and informs the police. J.C., now on the verge of being a wanted man, has to hide himself in isolation.

Despite Luke's warnings to let the police handle the situation, Rommel refuses to let go of what happened to his former fiancée and wants revenge. Planning to kill J.C., he gathers a group of men to back him up, consisting of one of J.C.'s (now former) henchmen Nero (who joined Rommel after finally having enough of J.C.'s abuse), muscle-bound Big Jake, bailed out criminal Crapout, and another one of J.C.'s henchmen, Cooch (who's secretly working undercover for J.C.).

With some help from Cooch, Rommel and his gang head out into the canyons where J.C. is hiding. Despite his wife Lois’ concerns about his safety, Luke goes after Rommel to stop him from getting his revenge. Meanwhile, Rommel discusses the plan on what they're going to do to kill J.C., which involves being stealthy and using their hands as defense mechanisms instead of guns, in spite of the risk that J.C.'s men may have some on them. They're reluctant on the plan, knowing the possibility of J.C.’s men having guns, but they stick to it regardless.

The next morning, Cooch sneaks over to J.C.'s hideout while everyone is still asleep and fills him in on what Rommel plans to do, and after he takes off, J.C. celebrates his victory with Paisley, thinking he has Rommel all figured out. However, Paisley breaks up with J.C. after putting up with all of his abuse and tries to escalate his fury with Rommel. Angry, he strangles Paisley to death, and then apologizes to her dead body and chides her for making him so angry. Luke, now caught up with Rommel, attempts to talk him out of getting his revenge on J.C., feeling he’s no better than the person he wants revenge on if he continues to follow through. Rommel refuses and sticks with the plan, feeling that Luke wouldn’t understand as his wife is still alive. Suddenly, everyone sees Cooch sneaking back into the spot where they were sleeping, and Rommel, Big Jake, Nero and Crapout gang up on him trying to find out what's going on. Cooch feigns ignorance, and they beat him up to get him to talk. Finally giving in, he tells Rommel J.C. is hiding in a rock quarry in the canyons, and Rommel orders Crapout to tie him up. Rommel goes over to Luke and asks him to call the police to let them know where J.C. is hiding, finally acknowledging that going after J.C. isn't worth it. However, he still keeps a tied-up Cooch to his side while keeping an eye out on J.C. to make sure he doesn't escape from his hideout, as Rommel's men stick with their intended plan, resulting in Big Jake being shot and killed after taking down two of J.C.'s men through stealth. Cooch escapes from Rommel, pleading J.C. not to kill Rommel while tumbling down a hill, only for J.C. to shoot his former weasel multiple times for being caught, killing him. With two of Rommel's men already dead, Nero and Crapout decide to play by their own rules and escape on a bike as the latter kills all of J.C.'s men with a gun instead of a battering ram as he originally planned to use, while J.C. attempts to shoot Rommel after Cooch exposed him.

With Rommel and J.C. left in the quarry, no guns on them, the two men brawl. When Rommel manages to gain the upper hand, he elects to walk away when the police are about to arrive, but J.C. picks up a gun from one of his dead henchmen (previously killed by Crapout) and shoots Rommel from behind. The last images of the film are a flashback of Rommel and his fiancée rolling about in a grassy field, superimposed over a shot of Rommel's dead body.

Cast
 Ross Hagen as Rommel
 Diane McBain as Rita
 Michael Pataki as JC
 Robert Tessier as Big Jake
 Dick Merrifield as Luke
 Claire Polan as Paisley
 Hoke Howell as Crapout
 Goldie Hawn Spectator (Uncredited)

Mystery Science Theater 3000
On September 29, 1990, The Sidehackers was featured and lampooned on Mystery Science Theater 3000. The episode (Season 2, Episode 2) includes one of the few occasions Cambot actually interacts in a way other than filming the experiment, by placing an ESPN-like score graphic during the movie's racing scenes.

The episode was released on DVD by Rhino Entertainment as part of the third volume of Mystery Science Theater 3000 DVD box sets. The collection also included the MST3K versions of The Atomic Brain (episode #518) and The Unearthly (episode #320) plus a disc of six MST3K shorts. The four-disc collection was later re-issued by Shout Factory in September 2016.

Edits
The writers were unaware of the film's darker content when they selected it for the show, only watching it in its entirety during their usual joke-writing sessions. They were horrified to discover the scene in which Rommel's girlfriend Rita is raped and killed, juxtaposed with shots of Luke and Lois' children playfully roughhousing. This scene, and the discovery of Rita's nearly nude body, were removed from the episode. To make up for the missing plot point, the character of Crow later remarks, "For those of you playing along at home, Rita is dead." According to the series' head writer (and future host) Michael J. Nelson, "We were all traumatized, the scene got cut, and from that day forward, movies were watched in their entirety (for such potentially offensive content) before they were selected." Earlier in the episode, the dinner scene at Rommel and Rita's cabin is also edited slightly: when J.C. flies into a rage and Nero tries to calm him, J.C. pushes him away, saying "Take your hands off me, you dirty nigger!" The latter half of the line is muted while Joel and the bots loudly rebuke J.C.

Soundtrack 
The movie's soundtrack LP was issued in 1969 in the U.S. by Amaret Records (ST 5004). The music was composed by Mike Curb and Jerry Styner, with lyrics by Guy Henric, and performed by the psychedelic, West Coast, rock band The New Life.

Track listing:
 "5 the Hard Way"
 "Love Theme (Only Love)" (instrumental)
 "Strollin' Sunday Mornin'"
 "5 the Hard Way" (instrumental)
 "Ha Lese (Le Di Khanna)"
 "Only Love" (instrumental)
 "Sidehacker"
 "Psychedelic Rape"
 "I Wanna Cry"
 "5 the Hard Way" (reprise instrumental)
 "Only Love"

The New Life were formed from the ashes of another band, The Cindermen, who were a garage rock group signed by Moonglow Records in 1965. The New Life was formed by Don Whaley; Alan Shapazian (ex-member of Raik's Progress); Phil Reed; and Duane Scott (also ex-member of Raik's Progress) who was the original keyboard player. Steve Wood, who had been in an Oak Cliff, Dallas, band called The Penthouse, replaced Duane Scott after about a year into the band. Besides the Sidehackers soundtrack, they also scored songs for a film called Black Water Gold. The New Life broke up  in 1970.

See also

 List of American films of 1969

Notes

External links
 

1969 films
1960s action films
American action films
American auto racing films
Crown International Pictures films
1960s English-language films
Films scored by Jerry Styner
Motorcycle racing films
American rape and revenge films
1969 directorial debut films
Films directed by Gus Trikonis
1960s American films